The 1962 USC Trojans football team represented the University of Southern California (USC) in the 1962 NCAA University Division football season. In their third year under head coach John McKay, the Trojans compiled an 11–0 record (4–0 against conference opponents), won the Athletic Association of Western Universities (AAWU or Big 6) championship, defeated Wisconsin in the 1963 Rose Bowl, outscored their opponents by a combined total of 261 to 92, and finished the season ranked #1 in both the AP Poll and UPI Coaches Poll.

Pete Beathard was the team's quarterback, completing 54 of 107 passes for 989 yards with ten touchdown passes and only one interception.  (Bill Nelsen also completed 36 of 80 passes for 682 yards and eight touchdown passes with two interceptions.)  Willie Brown was the team's leading rusher with 574 rushing yards (and 291 receiving yards). Hal Bedsole was the team's leading receiver with 33 catches for 827 yards and 11 touchdowns. Bedsole was inducted into the College Football Hall of Fame in 2012.

Two USC players were selected by the Associated Press (AP) as first-team players on the 1962 All-Pacific Coast football team. They were end Hal Bedsole and linebacker Damon Bame. Bedsole was also a consensus first-team All-American in 1962, while Bame received first-team All-America honors from the AP.

Schedule

Game summaries

Duke

SMU

Statistics
Receiving: Hal Bedsole 4 receptions, 112 yards, 2 TD

California

Statistics
Receiving: Hal Bedsole 6 receptions, 201 yards, 2 TD

Players
The following players were members of the 1962 USC football team.

 Damon Bame, linebacker
 Pete Beathard, quarterback
 Hal Bedsole, end
 Willie Brown, halfback
 John Brownwood, end
 Ron Butcher
 Mac Byrd
 Jay Clark
 Ken Del Conte, halfback
 Craig Fertig, quarterback
 Bill Fisk
 Mike Gale
 Stan Gonta
 Ron Heller
 Fred Hill
 Gary Hill
 Phil Hoover
 Hudson Houck
 Loran Hunt
 Tom Johnson
 Ernie Jones
 Randy Jones
 Gary Kirner, tackle
 Pete Lubisich, guard
 Tom Lupo
 Marv Marinovich, guard
 Rich McMahon
 Bill Nelsen, quarterback
 Gary Potter
 Ernie Pye
 John Ratliff, guard
 Lynn Reade
 Larry Sagouspe
 Armando Sanchez
 Denny Schmidt
 Ron Smedley
 Bob Svihus, tackle
 Toby Thurlow
 Gary Winslow
 Ben Wilson, fullback

Coaching staff and administration
 Head coach: John McKay
 Assistant coaches: Mel Hein, Mike Giddings, Raymond George, Dave Levy, Charlie Hall, Marv Goux, and Joe Margucci
 Athletic director: Jess Hill
 Senior manager: Mike Leddel

References

Further reading
 "Trojans 1962: John McKay's First National Championship", by Bill Block, iUniverse, 2012

USC
USC Trojans football seasons
College football national champions
Pac-12 Conference football champion seasons
Rose Bowl champion seasons
College football undefeated seasons
USC Trojans football